Asha Kumari B.K. is a Nepali politician that serves as a member of the House of Representatives in the 1st Federal Parliament of Nepal. She was elected under the Dalit/Backward area group from the party list for the CPN (Unified Marxist–Leninist).

Political career 
She was a member of the Development and Technology Committee of the House of Representatives during her term.

References

Living people
21st-century Nepalese women politicians
21st-century Nepalese politicians
Nepal MPs 2017–2022
Dalit politicians
People from Bajhang District
Communist Party of Nepal (Unified Marxist–Leninist) politicians
1981 births